Pyrgotis zygiana is a species of moth of the family Tortricidae. It is endemic to New Zealand.

P. zygiana was first described by Edward Meyrick in 1882 from a specimen obtained in Canterbury.  This species has also been recorded in Titirangi.

The wingspan is about 14 mm. The forewings are dark reddish ochreous fuscous, mixed with dark fuscous and strigulated (finely streaked) with leaden grey. The hindwings are grey.

The larvae feed exclusively on Prumnopitys taxifolia.

References

Moths described in 1882
Archipini
Moths of New Zealand
Endemic fauna of New Zealand
Endemic moths of New Zealand